Prattipadu is a defunct Indian Railways station near Prattipadu, a village in West Godavari district of Andhra Pradesh. It lies on the Vijayawada–Chennai section and is administered under Vijayawada railway division of South Central Railway zone. No train halts in this station every day.

History
Between 1893 and 1896,  of the East Coast State Railway, between Vijayawada and PTPUttack was opened for traffic. The southern part of the West Coast State Railway (from Waltair to Vijayawada) was taken over by Madras Railway in 1901.

References

External links 

Railway stations in West Godavari district
Vijayawada railway division